Hair is a British reality television series to find Britain's best amateur hair stylist that was first broadcast on BBC Three on 25 February 2014. The first series was presented by Steve Jones, whilst the second series is fronted by Katherine Ryan. The judges are Denise McAdam and Alain Pichon. On 30 October 2014, it was revealed that Hair had been renewed for a second series and promoted from BBC Three to BBC Two. The second and final series comprises eight half-hour episodes and began on 13 July 2015.

Production
Hair was commissioned by Zai Bennett and Emma Willis and was produced by BBC Television.

Episode list

Series 1 (2014)

Series 2 (2015)

Series

Series 1 (2014)
Eight contestants participated in the first series of Hair.

Series 2 (2015)
Ten contestants participated in the second and final series of Hair.

References

External links
 
 
 

2010s British reality television series
2014 British television series debuts
2015 British television series endings
BBC high definition shows
BBC reality television shows
English-language television shows